Matt McKay (born 21 January 1981) is an English footballer who played as a midfielder in the Football League for Chester City.

McKay joined Everton from Chester on transfer deadline day on 26 March 1998. He did not make any appearances for the Everton first team and was forced to retire at the early age of 21 due to injury.

References

Chester City F.C. players
Association football midfielders
Everton F.C. players
1981 births
Living people
English footballers
Footballers from Warrington